Henry Purcell (1659–1695) was an English composer.

Purcell may also refer to:

Places 
Purcell, Indiana, an unincorporated community in Johnson Township, Knox County, Indiana
Purcell, Missouri, a city in Jasper County, Missouri, United States
Purcell, Oklahoma, a city in and the county seat of McClain County, Oklahoma, United States
Purcell School, a specialist music school in Hertfordshire, England
Purcell Mountains, a component of the Columbia Mountains, British Columbia, Canada

People with the surname
Purcell (surname)

Other uses 
 Purcell (architects), formerly Purcell Miller Tritton, a British architectural firm founded in 1947